, commonly known as  or simply , is a Japanese financial services company affiliated to Mizuho Financial Group. Founded in 1951, Credit Saison is the 3rd largest credit card issuer with over 20 million cardholders in Japan, behind JCB and Visa Japan.

History
It was originally an operator of department stores specialized in installment selling.

Seibu Retailing Group, one of the (now former) subsidiaries of Seibu Railway, purchased Midoriya in 1976, attempting to add financial services to its portfolio of customer services. Midoriya's retailing division was transferred to Seibu Department Stores, and Midoriya itself was renamed  retaining credit management division.

Seibu Railway spun off Seibu Retailing in 1983 and Seibu Retailing was rebranded as Saison Group. Seibu Credit issued the first Saison Card in 1983. Seibu Credit finally rebranded itself as Credit Saison in 1989, standing one of the Big Five core businesses of Saison Group.

Following the collapse of Japanese asset price bubble in 1990s, Saison Group fell into financial difficulties. The group's longtime president Seiji Tsutsumi was expelled from management in 1991. The group's creditors including Dai-Ichi Kangyo Bank and Industrial Bank of Japan (now part of Mizuho Financial) pressed the group to restructure its business. Credit Saison parted from other retailers of Saison Group, and formed an alliance with Mizuho in early 2000s.

Saison Card
Credit Saison issues credit cards  branded Visa, Mastercard, JCB, or American Express.

For their history, many cards are for customers of former Seibu Railway group companies and Seibu Retailing Group companies including Seibu Railway, Seiyu, Parco, and MUJI. Sogo & Seibu was acquired by Seven & I and left from the group, but Credit Saison and Seven & I founded a joint company and issues Saison Card.
As a Mizuho financial group company, Mizuho Bank and many other banks issues cashcard/Saison Card joint card.
Credi Saison also issues for many other non-group companies.

Annual fees of Saison Card are free for normal cards, 1,575 yen to 3,150 yen for some cards, and 10,500 yen or more for gold or platinum cards.

Volume of new contracts
As of March 30, 2006:
 Credit card-related shopping services: ¥ 2,527,808 million JPY
 Agency services: ¥ 747,998 million JPY
 Cash advances: ¥ 618,921 million JPY
 Specialty loans: ¥ 120,117 million JPY
 Leases: ¥ 90,011 million JPY

References

 Annual Report 2006. Credit Saison Co., Ltd. 2006-03-31.
 Fact Book 2006. Credit Saison Co., Ltd. 2006-03-31.

External links
Official Website 
Credit Saison Corporate Info
Prepaid Card Vanilla Info

Financial services companies based in Tokyo
Credit cards
Companies listed on the Tokyo Stock Exchange
Financial services companies established in 1946
Japanese companies established in 1946
Fuyo Group